Austin Preparatory School is a co-educational Catholic school located in Reading, Massachusetts.  It is located in the Roman Catholic Archdiocese of Boston.  It was founded by the Order of Saint Augustine in 1961. The institution is colloquially referred to as Austin Prep and serves students in grades 6–12.

On January 20, 2022, the school announced that it would leave the Catholic Central League and Massachusetts Interscholastic Athletic Association to join the New England Preparatory School Athletic Council starting in the Fall of 2022. The school will begin NEPSAC competition as an independent.

Notable alumni 

 Thomas Birmingham, former Massachusetts Senate President
 Tom Fitzgerald (hockey) '86, general manager and executive Vice President of the New Jersey Devils and former NHL player
 James M. Lindsay '77, senior vice president of the Council on Foreign Relations
 Blaise MacDonald '81, current head hockey coach at Colby College
 Brian Shannon '86, author and technical analyst
 Paul Sullivan '75, radio talk show host at WBZ until his death in 2007

Notes and references

External links

Official site

Catholic secondary schools in Massachusetts
Austin Preparatory(Massachusetts)
Educational institutions established in 1961
1961 establishments in Massachusetts